Geh is a German surname related to the French Gay. Geh may also refer to a romanized version of the Chinese surname Ni. 

The surname may refer to the following notable people:
 Adalbert Geheeb (1842–1909), German botanist
 Geh Min (born 1950), Singaporean politician
 Selvanus Geh (born 1993), Indonesian badminton player
 Sue Geh (1959–1998), Australian basketball player

German-language surnames